Edilúcio de Souza Rocha or simply Lúcio (born January 1, 1982 in Guanambi-BA), is a Brazilian central defender who played for Democrata GV-MG.

Clube Atlético Mineiro signed Lúcio after he had a strong performance with Democrata in 2007, but he never appeared for the club's first team. Lúcio spent most of his playing career with Democrata, including spells during 2007, 2008, 2009, 2011 and 2013.

He would play in the Campeonato Brasileiro Série B with Agremiação Sportiva Arapiraquense during 2010. Lúcio made his only start for ASA in a match against Bragantino in May 2010.

References

External links
Profile at Soccerway.com
CBF
CRB.net

1982 births
Living people
Brazilian footballers
Esporte Clube Democrata players
Clube Atlético Mineiro players
Clube de Regatas Brasil players
Association football defenders